Events from the year 1618 in Ireland.

Incumbent
Monarch: James I

Events
23 January – Charter of Waterford revoked after election of recusants (restored 1626).
19 February – Richard Wingfield is created first Viscount Powerscourt.
1 October – native Irish ordered to leave lands of the British Plantation of Ulster by 1 May 1619 or be fined.
1 December – Captain Nicholas Pynnar begins his Survey of the Escheated Counties of Ulster.

Publications
Aodh Mac Cathmhaoil (Hugh MacCaghwell or Hugo Cavellus) publishes  (or ) in Irish at Louvain.

Births
Thomas Blood, soldier who tries to steal the Crown Jewels of England from the Tower of London in 1671 (d. 1680)

Deaths
Richard Stanihurst, translator, poet and historian (b. 1547)

References

 
1610s in Ireland
Ireland
Years of the 17th century in Ireland